Three Dog Night is an American rock band formed in 1967, founded by vocalists Danny Hutton, Cory Wells, and Chuck Negron. This lineup was soon augmented by Jimmy Greenspoon (keyboards), Joe Schermie (bass), Michael Allsup (guitar), and Floyd Sneed (drums). The band had 21 Billboard Top 40 hits between 1969 and 1975, with three hitting number one. Three Dog Night recorded many songs written by outside songwriters, and they helped to introduce mainstream audiences to writers such as Randy Newman ("Mama Told Me Not to Come"), Paul Williams ("An Old Fashioned Love Song"), and Hoyt Axton ("Joy to the World", "Never Been to Spain").

Name origin
The commentary included in the CD set Celebrate: The Three Dog Night Story, 1965–1975 states that vocalist Danny Hutton's girlfriend, actress June Fairchild (best known as the "Ajax Lady" from the Cheech and Chong movie Up In Smoke) suggested the name after reading a magazine article about Aboriginal Australians, in which it was explained that on cold nights they would customarily sleep while embracing a dingo, a native species of wild dog. On colder nights they would sleep with two dogs and, if the night were freezing, it was a "three dog night".

Musician Van Dyke Parks, an arranger at Warner Bros Records, disputed the above story and claimed that he coined the name. On 10 September 2018, he wrote on Twitter, "I wuz [sic] nuts about Hutton’s girlfriend. Quite a dancer. Yet, she didn’t read Mankind magazine, nor have an inkling of anthtopology [sic] and the cold aboriginal nights that inspired my suggestion."

History

Background

The three vocalists, Danny Hutton (who got his start with Hanna-Barbera Records in 1964), Chuck Negron, and Cory Wells (who landed a recording contract with Dunhill Records) first came together in 1967. They initially went by the name of Redwood and made some recordings with Brian Wilson while the Beach Boys were working on the album Wild Honey.

Redwood was briefly poised to be one of the first artists signed to the Beach Boys' Brother Records. According to Beach Boy Mike Love, "[Brian] had them in the studio for several days, and he was really funny. They didn't meet up to his expectations. ... They'd go in and they wouldn't sing well enough for him. ... but they went off and made billions." Brian attempted to produce an album for Redwood, but after the recording of three songs, including "Time to Get Alone" and "Darlin'", this motion was halted by his bandmates, who wanted Brian to focus on the Beach Boys' contractual obligations. According to Negron, due to the commercial failure of Smiley Smile and Brian's waning commitment to his band, "the other Beach Boys wanted Brian's immense songwriting and producing talents used strictly to enhance their own careers". Negron then noted that he would have done the same thing if in the Beach Boys' position.

Shortly after abandoning the Redwood moniker in 1968, the vocalists hired a group of backing musicians – Ron Morgan on guitar, Floyd Sneed on drums, Joe Schermie from the Cory Wells Blues Band on bass, and Jimmy Greenspoon on keyboards – and soon took the name Three Dog Night. Morgan left the band before its first album was recorded and subsequently joined the Electric Prunes. Michael Allsup was quickly recruited to replace Morgan on guitar.

1968–1972 

Three Dog Night made its official debut in 1968 at the Whisky a Go Go, at a 5 p.m. press party hosted by Dunhill Records. They were still in the process of making their first album Three Dog Night when they heard the favorable reactions from the hypercritical audience.

The album Three Dog Night was a success with its hit songs "Nobody", "Try A Little Tenderness", and "One" and helped the band gain recognition and become one of the top-drawing concert acts of their time.

In December 1972, Three Dog Night hosted Dick Clark's first New Year's Eve special, which was then entitled Three Dog Night's New Year's Rockin' Eve.

1973–1979
In 1973, Three Dog Night filed a $6 million lawsuit against their former booking agent, American Talent International (ATI), for continuing to advertise in the media that the band was still with their agency when in fact they signed with William Morris Agency in October 1972. Other damages were sought due to ATI taking deposits for booking Three Dog Night, whom they no longer represented.

Joe Schermie left in early 1973 due to "problems arising that were apparently unresolvable". His replacement was Jack Ryland in 1973, and the band then became an eight-piece with the inclusion of a second keyboard player, Skip Konte (ex-Blues Image), in late 1973. In late 1974, Allsup and Sneed left to form a new band, SS Fools, with Schermie and Bobby Kimball (later of Toto). New guitarist James "Smitty" Smith and drummer Mickey McMeel were recruited, but by 1975, Smith was replaced by Al Ciner from Rufus and the American Breed, and Ryland by Rufus bassist Dennis Belfield. Mickey McMeel would go on to co-star as "Turkey", the drummer of Kaptain Kool and the Kongs, in the children's television series The Krofft Supershow.

For the albums Cyan, Hard Labor, and Coming Down Your Way, Hutton did not show up for many of the recording sessions. Cory Wells became fed up with his frequent absence and Hutton was fired from the band in late 1975. He was replaced by Jay Gruska.

Hours before the first concert of their 1975 tour, Chuck Negron was arrested for the possession of narcotics but was soon released on $10,000 bond.

Coming Down Your Way, released in May 1975, failed to sell well in the United States, likely due to poor promotion on account of the band's recently switched label, ABC, and the growing popularity of disco music. Disappointed by this, the band decided "Til The World Ends" would be the only single released off the album, which ended up being the group's last Billboard Hot 100 Top 40 hit.

Jay Gruska toured with the band to promote their last album, American Pastime, released in March 1976. Still, the album did not sell well for the same reasons as before. However, the only single released off the album, "Everybody's a Masterpiece" became an Adult contemporary hit. Another former Rufus band member, Ron Stockert, was recruited as second keyboardist after Konte left in the first half of 1976. The group played their final show at the Greek Theatre in Los Angeles on July 26, 1976.

In 1979, NBC reported that the band's accountant "was shot in the arm and paralyzed, in what the police believe was a mob dispute over Three Dog Night." Joe Ulloa, a "reputed mob enforcer from New York", was investigated as being involved.

1981–1990s
In 1981, Three Dog Night reunited and released the ska-inspired It's a Jungle in 1983 on the small Passport Records label, which garnered some airplay on the new wave circuit. The EP failed to sell after Passport went bankrupt. The reunion featured all of the original members, except Joe Schermie, who was succeeded by Mike Seifrit until 1982, and then by Richard Grossman, who stayed until 1984. Two guitarists, Paul Kingery and Steve Ezzo, occasionally played with the band, filling in for Allsup on dates he was not able to make between 1982 and 1984. Ezzo replaced Allsup when he departed in late 1984 to take care of some personal and family matters. Sneed was let go from the band at the same time. In early 1985, keyboardist Rick Seratte (formerly of Poco and later with Whitesnake and others) filled in for Greenspoon, who was ill, and the band hit the road with a revised lineup that included Seratte, Steve Ezzo, bassist Scott Manzo and drummer Mike Keeley. The band toured all through 1985, but in late '85, Negron was forced back into rehab. Seratte left the band to pursue other offers and Greenspoon rejoined the band with Negron in late 1985 and were back touring with the group.

By December 1985, after a relapse into his drug habit, Negron was let go, and the group continued with Wells and Hutton fronting the band and Paul Kingery was brought back on guitar to cover Chuck's vocal harmonies. In 1986, their song "In My Heart" was featured in Robotech: The Movie.

More changes in personnel occurred when guitarist T. J. Parker and vocalist and bassist Gary Moon replaced Kingery and Manzo in 1988, and were replaced themselves by Mike Cuneo and Richard Campbell during 1989.

Allsup returned to the group to replace Cuneo in the spring of 1991. Negron entered drug rehab, but did not return to the band.

Pat Bautz succeeded Keeley as drummer in 1993.

In 1993, Three Dog Night performed for The Family Channel show Spotlight on Country, filmed in Myrtle Beach, South Carolina. Kingery returned to the band as their bass player in 1996 following Campbell's departure.

2000–2012
Original bassist Joe Schermie died on March 26, 2002. In May 2002 the band released Three Dog Night with The London Symphony Orchestra. The album was recorded in Los Angeles and in London at Abbey Road Studios and includes two new songs: "Overground" and "Sault Ste. Marie". They also released a DVD of a filmed symphony performance from 2000 titled Three Dog Night Live With the Tennessee Symphony Orchestra in May 2002.  In the summer of 2004, 80s bassist Scott Manzo returned briefly to fill in for Paul Kingery.

In October 2004, Three Dog Night released The 35th Anniversary Hits Collection Featuring The London Symphony Orchestra. The album includes live versions of "Eli's Coming", "Brickyard Blues", "Try a Little Tenderness", and "Family of Man". In August 2008, they released Three Dog Night Greatest Hits Live, a compilation of previously unissued live recordings from concerts in Frankfurt, Germany and Edmonton, London in 1972 and 1973. On October 24, 2009, they released three new songs: "Heart of Blues", "Prayer of the Children", and "Two Lights In The Nighttime". They issued two new songs on their 35th Anniversary Hits Collection Featuring The London Symphony Orchestra.

2012–present
In the summer of 2012, guitarist Allsup was hospitalized for an intestinal disorder, forcing Kingery to move back to guitar, while Danny's son Timothy Hutton played bass. This happened again during the summer of 2015 when Allsup was forced to miss some shows. On March 11, 2015, Jimmy Greenspoon died from cancer, aged 67. His place at the keyboards was taken by Eddie Reasoner who had substituted for him when he took ill in mid-2014.

On October 21, 2015, Cory Wells died at his home in Dunkirk, New York at age 74. In November 2015, the band announced that singer David Morgan would be joining them on the road. He was a former member of the Association. In April 2017, Howard Laravea replaced Eddie Reasoner on keyboards. He was formerly with Frankie Valli and the Four Seasons.

When Three Dog Night returned to touring in August 2021, it was without Michael Allsup, who was replaced with Tim Hutton on bass. Paul Kingery switched back to guitar. Danny Hutton has stated during concert appearances that Three Dog Night has been recording a new album, before performing their new song "Prayers of the Children".

Personnel

Members
Current members
 Danny Hutton – vocals (1967–1975, 1981–present)
 Paul Kingery – vocals, guitar, bass (1982-1983 as substitute; 1985–1988, 1996–present)
 Pat Bautz – drums, vocals (1993–present)
 David Morgan – vocals (2015–present)
 Howard Laravea – keyboards (2017–present)
 Timothy Hutton - bass, vocals (2021–present)

Former members

 Cory Wells – vocals, rhythm guitar (1967–1976, 1981–2015; his death)
 Chuck Negron – vocals (1967–1976, 1981–1985)
 Michael Allsup – guitar (1967–1974, 1981–1984, 1991–2021)
 Jimmy Greenspoon – keyboards (1968–1976, 1981–2015; his death)
 Floyd Sneed – drums (1968–1974, 1981–1984; died 2023)
 Joe Schermie – bass (1968–1973; died 2002)
 Jack Ryland – bass (1973–1975; died 1996)
 Skip Konte – keyboards (1973–1976)
 Mickey McMeel – drums (1974–1976)
 James "Smitty" Smith – guitar (1974–1975)
 Dennis Belfield – bass (1975–1976)
 Al Ciner – guitar (1975–1976)
 Jay Gruska – vocals (1976)
 Ron Stockert – keyboards (1976)
John Mrowiec drums(1978-1979) Jeff Seifrit – bass (1981–1982)
 Richard Grossman – bass (1982–1984)
 Rick Seratte – keyboards (1985)
 Mike Keeley – drums (1985–1993)
 Scott Manzo – bass (1985–1988, 2004)
 Steve Ezzo – guitar (fill-in for Allsup 1983–1984, 1985)
 Gary Moon – bass, vocals (1988–1989)
 T.J. Parker – guitar (1988–1989)
 Richard Campbell – bass, vocals (1989–1996)
 Eddie Reasoner – keyboards (2015–2017; substitute – 2014–2015) 
 Mike Cuneo – guitar (1989–1991)

Timeline

Lead vocal credits
"An Old Fashioned Love Song" – Negron
"Black and White" – Hutton
"Celebrate" – Hutton (Verse 1), Negron (Verse 2), Wells (Verse 3), who sings melody through the end refrain
"Easy to Be Hard" – Negron
"Eli's Coming" – Wells
"Joy to the World" – Negron
"Let Me Serenade You" – Wells
"Liar" – Hutton
"Mama Told Me (Not to Come)" – Wells
"Never Been to Spain" – Wells
"One" – Negron
"One Man Band" – Hutton sings melody with Negron on harmony on verses, then Negron takes the lead through the end refrain
"Out in the Country" – Group vocal in unison
"Pieces of April" – Negron
"Play Something Sweet (Brickyard Blues)" – Wells
"Shambala" – Wells
"Sure As I'm Sittin' Here" – Wells
"The Family of Man" – Hutton (Verse 1), Negron (Verse 2), Wells (Verse 3)
"The Show Must Go On" – Negron
"Til the World Ends" – Negron
"Try a Little Tenderness" – Wells
"Your Song" – Hutton

Lineups

Discography

 Three Dog Night (1968)
 Suitable for Framing (1969)
 Captured Live at the Forum (1969)
 It Ain't Easy (1970)
 Naturally (1970)
 Harmony (1971)
 Seven Separate Fools (1972)
 Cyan (1973)
 Hard Labor (1974)
 Coming Down Your Way (1975)
 American Pastime (1976)
 It's a Jungle (1983)

Awards and recognition
 Three Dog Night was inducted into The Vocal Group Hall of Fame in 2000.

References

Sources 
Three Dog Nightmare. Chuck Negron. Renaissance Books 1st edition (June 1999) 
One Is the Loneliest Number: On the Road and Behind the Scenes With the Legendary Rock Band Three Dog Night. Greenspoon, Jimmy and Bego, Mark. Pharos Books (January 1991). 
 Lawrence, Guy (2006). "Yogi Bear's Nuggets: A Hanna-Barbera 45 Guide". Spectropop.com
 Bubblegum University

External links

[ Three Dog Night] at AllMusic
 
'Three Dog Night Vocal Group Hall of Fame

American pop rock music groups
American soft rock music groups
Columbia Records artists
Dunhill Records artists
Epic Records artists
MCA Records artists
MGM Records artists
Musical groups established in 1967
Musical groups disestablished in 1976
Musical groups reestablished in 1981
Musical groups from Los Angeles